The 22917 Bandra Terminus–Haridwar Express is a Superfast Express train belonging to Indian Railways – Western Railway zone that runs between  and  in India.

It operates as train number 22917 from Bandra Terminus to Haridwar Junction and as train number 22918 in the reverse direction, serving the state of Uttarakhand, Uttar Pradesh, Delhi, Haryana, Rajasthan, Madhya Pradesh, Gujarat & Maharashtra.

Coaches

The train has standard LHB rakes with a max speed of 130 kmph. The train consists of 22 coaches:

 1 AC II Tier
 6 AC III Tier
 9 Sleeper coaches
 4 General Unreserved
 1 End-on Generator
 1 SLR

As with most train services in India, coach composition may be amended at the discretion of Indian Railways depending on demand.

Service

22917 Bandra Terminus–Haridwar Express covers the distance of 1616 kilometres in 26 hours 45 mins (61 km/hr) & in 27 hours 30 mins as 22918 Haridwar–Bandra Terminus Express (59 km/hr).

As the average speed of the train is above 55 km/hr, as per Indian Railways rules, its fare includes a Superfast surcharge.

Route and halts

 
The important halts of the train are:

Schedule

Rake sharing

The train shares its rake with 19021/19022 Bandra Terminus–Lucknow Weekly Express.

Traction

As the route is now fully electrified, it is hauled by Vadodara-based WAP-7 for its entire journey.

External links

References 

Transport in Mumbai
Trains from Haridwar
Express trains in India
Rail transport in Maharashtra
Rail transport in Gujarat
Rail transport in Madhya Pradesh
Rail transport in Rajasthan
Rail transport in Haryana
Rail transport in Delhi
Railway services introduced in 2013